Guariglia is an Italian surname. Notable people with the surname include:

 Justin Brice Guariglia (born 1974), American artist and photographer
 Raffaele Guariglia (1889–1970), Italian diplomat
  (born 1997), Italian basketball player

Italian-language surnames